Joe Calvin Devance Jr. (born February 19, 1982) is a Filipino-American former professional basketball player who won 12 championships over the course of his career with the Alaska Aces, the Magnolia franchise, and the Barangay Ginebra San Miguel of the Philippine Basketball Association (PBA).

Professional career

Welcoat Dragons (2007–2008)
The forward Devance attended the University of Texas, El Paso between 2001 and 2004. He entered the PBA in 2007 as the first overall pick by then-expansion team Welcoat. Though he had minutes, Devance was not really able to showcase his talent, playing center under coach Caloy Garcia. He wore number 53 with the Dragons.

Alaska Aces (2008–2011)
After playing one season with the Welcoat Dragons, he was then traded to the Alaska Aces for Sol Mercado. He is a feared outside scorer and a serious threat in the low post, a testament to his offensive capabilities.

He is touted as the next most important player and the cornerstone of the Aces’ frontline until the unthinkable happened — Devance and the Aces had to part ways only after three seasons after Devance was shipped to the Air21 Express in exchange for the talented but underachieving forward Jay-R Reyes.

On his years as an Ace, he was able to reach three finals appearances during the 2008–09 and 2009–10 seasons though he only had a championship during the 2010 Fiesta Conference.

After playing three seasons in the Alaska Aces, Alaska was forced to let go of Devance after the talented Fil-Am forward begged off. Sources said Devance wanted out of Alaska, hoping to get better compensation somewhere else even though Alaska already offered Devance the maximum pay of P350,000 per month. Despite this, Alaska had no choice, so they traded him to Air21 Express for their big man Jay-R Reyes.

B-Meg / San Mig Coffee / Purefoods Star / Star (2011–2015)
After a week, Devance was quickly traded to the B-Meg Derby Ace Llamados in exchange for Niño Canaleta and Jondan Salvador. Devance was never able to play a game for the Express.

Devance was included in the List of Candidates for the 2010–11 PBA Most Valuable Player Candidates List and led the Statistical Points Average with 31.89 points. In the end of the 2010–11 season, Devance was included in the 2nd Mythical Team along with his teammate James Yap, Jay Washington, Jayson Castro, and Ali Peek.
Devance was a key piece in San Mig Coffee's Grand Slam season in the 2013–14 season, averaging 9.4 points per game and 4.3 rebounds per game. Devance signed a 2-year extension deal with the Purefoods Star Hotshots in August 2014.

Barangay Ginebra (2015–2022)
On September 28, 2015, Devance was traded to the Barangay Ginebra San Miguel in a series of trades that involved four teams namely: Barangay Ginebra, Star, Barako Bull Energy, and GlobalPort Batang Pier. He again reunited with his former coach at Alaska and Star, Tim Cone.

On June 1, 2022, before the start of the 2022–23 PBA season, Devance announced on Instagram that he will retire from the PBA, Then later he announce that he will join in the Coaching staff of the Gin Kings.

PBA career statistics

As of the end of 2021 season

Season-by-season averages

|-
| align=left | 
| align=left | Welcoat
| 34 || 29.2 || .408 || .291 || .608 || 6.5 || 1.1 || .5 || .8 || 13.6
|-
| align=left | 
| align=left | Alaska
| 47 || 30.2 || .460 || .350 || .660 || 6.3 || 1.6 || .5 || .7 || 13.5
|-
| align=left | 
| align=left | Alaska
| 62 || 31.0 || .454 || .299 || .695 || 6.1 || 2.2 || .5 || .7 || 12.6
|-
| align=left rowspan=2| 
| align=left | Alaska
| rowspan=2|42 || rowspan=2|35.7 || rowspan=2|.445 || rowspan=2|.363 || rowspan=2|.656 || rowspan=2|8.4 || rowspan=2|3.5 || rowspan=2|.5 || rowspan=2|1.1 || rowspan=2|16.5
|-
| align=left | B-Meg Derby Ace
|-
| align=left | 
| align=left | B-Meg
| 38 || 25.5 || .428 || .241 || .720 || 4.8 || 2.1 || .4 || .4 || 9.1
|-
| align=left | 
| align=left | San Mig Coffee
| 60 || 30.2 || .452 || .327 || .642 || 5.3 || 2.6 || .5 || .8 || 9.9
|-
| align=left | 
| align=left | San Mig Super Coffee
| 67 || 30.8 || .442 || .263 || .685 || 4.3 || 2.3 || .7 || .5 || 9.4
|-
| align=left | 
| align=left | Purefoods / Star
| 45 || 30.9 || .451 || .323 || .670 || 5.1 || 2.6 || .6 || .4 || 10.4
|-
| align=left | 
| align=left | Barangay Ginebra
| 48 || 20.8 || .415 || .229 || .682 || 3.4 || 1.9 || .2 || .2 || 6.6
|-
| align=left | 
| align=left | Barangay Ginebra
| 60 || 28.4 || .493 || .355 || .654 || 5.1 || 3.1 || .6 || .4 || 11.4
|-
| align=left | 
| align=left | Barangay Ginebra
| 37 || 28.6 || .475 || .350 || .750 || 3.8 || 3.4 || .8 || .3 || 10.1
|-
| align=left | 
| align=left | Barangay Ginebra
| 32 || 20.4 || .339 || .272 || .667 || 3.2 || 2.1 || .6 || .1 || 4.6
|-
| align=left | 
| align=left | Barangay Ginebra
| 20 || 13.6 || .444 || .133 || 1.000 || 2.9 || 1.4 || .4 || .1 || 4.2
|-
| align=left | 
| align=left | Barangay Ginebra
| 18 || 13.4 || .304 || .083 || .615 || 1.5 || 1.1|| .3 || .1 || 2.4
|-class=sortbottom
| align=center colspan=2 | Career
| 610 || 27.9 || .445 || .304 || .672 || 5.0 || 2.3 || .5 || .5 || 10.3

References

Living people
1982 births
21st-century African-American sportspeople
African-American basketball players
Alaska Aces (PBA) players
American men's basketball players
American sportspeople of Filipino descent
Barangay Ginebra San Miguel players
Basketball players from Hawaii
Filipino men's basketball players
Magnolia Hotshots players
Philippine Basketball Association All-Stars
Power forwards (basketball)
Rain or Shine Elasto Painters draft picks
Rain or Shine Elasto Painters players
Small forwards
Sportspeople from Honolulu
UTEP Miners men's basketball players
Citizens of the Philippines through descent